Ian Maguire (born 19 April 1994) is an Irish Gaelic footballer who plays for Cork Senior Championship club St Finbarr's and at senior level with the Cork county team. He usually lines out as at midfield.

Career
Maguire first came to Gaelic football prominence at juvenile and underage levels with the St Finbarr's club while also lining out with Coláiste an Spioraid Naoimh in the Corn Uí Mhuirí. After making his senior team debut, he was captain of the club's Munster Club Championship-winning team in 2022. Maguire first appeared on the inter-county scene as a member of the Cork minor football team in 2012 before later lining out in the 2013 All-Ireland under-21 final defeat by Galway. He made his first appearance with the Cork senior football team in a Round 4 qualifier against Sligo in 2014.

Career statistics

Honours
University College Cork
Sigerson Cup: 2014

St Finbarr's
Munster Senior Club Football Championship: 2021 (c)
Cork Premier Senior Football Championship: 2018, 2021 (c)
Kelleher Shield: 2019
Cork Minor Football Championship: 2012

Cork
National Football League Division 3: 2020
Munster Under-21 Football Championship: 2013, 2014

References

External link
Ian Maguire profile at the Cork GAA website

1994 births
Living people
Cork inter-county Gaelic footballers
St Finbarr's Gaelic footballers
UCC Gaelic footballers